Pradhan Mantri Jan Dhan Yojana is a financial inclusion program of the Government of India open to Indian citizens (minors of age 10 and older can also open an account with a guardian to manage it), that aims to expand affordable access to financial services such as bank accounts, remittances, credit, insurance and pensions. This financial inclusion campaign was launched by the Prime Minister of India Narendra Modi on 28 August 2014. He had announced this scheme on his first Independence Day speech on 15 August 2014.

Run by Department of Financial Services, Ministry of Finance, under this scheme 15 million bank accounts were opened on inauguration day. The Guinness Book of World Records recognized this achievement, stating: "The most bank accounts opened in one week as a part of the financial inclusion campaign is 18,096,130 and was achieved by the Government of India from August 23 to 29, 2014". By 27 June 2018, over 318 million bank accounts were opened and over ₹792 billion (US$12 billion) were deposited under the scheme.

History
It was launched by the Prime Minister Narendra Modi on 15 August 2014. The slogan of the scheme is "Mera Khaata, Bhagya Vidhata" (meaning "My account, fortune maker") The scheme was launched after the failure of previous government schemes, including Swaabhimaan. Swaabhimaan was a 2011 campaign of the Government of India which aimed to bring banking services to rural areas.

Investments
Pradhan Mantri Jan-Dhan Yojana statistics as on 17 Aug 2022 (All figures in crores)
Jan Dhan Yojana was announced by Prime Minister Narendra Modi on 15 August 2014 and the scheme was launched on 28 August 2014. 

Number of bank accounts opened annually

Performance
Due to the preparations done in the run-up to the inauguration, 15 million bank accounts were opened on inauguration day. The Prime Minister, Narendra Modi, declared on this occasion, "Let us celebrate today as the day of financial freedom." By September 2014, 30.2 million accounts were opened:
 with State Bank of India 2.99 million accounts,
 Canara Bank 1.62 million accounts,
 Central Bank of India 1.60 million accounts and
 Bank of Baroda 1.42 million accounts.

On 20 January 2015, the scheme entered the Guinness Book of World Records, setting a new record for 'The most bank accounts opened in one week'.

Uttar Pradesh and West Bengal have 29% of the total deposits under the scheme, whereas Kerala and Goa became the first states in the country to have at least one basic bank account in every household.

The total number of account holders stood at 294.8 million, including 176.1 million account holders from rural and semi-urban branches. A total of 227 million RuPay cards have been issued by National Payments Corporation of India (NPCI) till August 2017.

According to various studies, "Beyond enabling account ownership and the use of financial services, the PMJDY also facilitated financial inclusion for a variety of demographics. While the program has made significant headway towards genuine financial inclusion, it is clear that improving policy communication, widening and deepening progress in low-income states, and ironing out the kinks in the bank-agent model will be crucial if these hard-fought gains are to prove sustainable." At least 300 million new families have got Jan Dhan accounts in which almost  have been deposited, Prime Minister Narendra Modi said on 28 August 2017, on the eve of the third anniversary of the scheme.

As of January 27, 2021, a total number of 417.5 million accounts have been opened under the Pradhan Mantri Jan Dhan Yojana (PMJDY), out of which 359.6 million accounts are operative.

Reactions
The scheme has been criticized by the opposition as an effort to please voters, and that it has created unnecessary work-burden on the public-sector banks. According to critics, offers like zero balance, free insurance and overdraft facility would result in duplication. Many individuals who already had bank accounts may have had accounts created in their names, lured by insurance cover and overdraft facility. As per the scheme, a very few people are eligible to get the life insurance worth  with a validity of just five years. The claimed overdraft facility has been completely left upon the banks. As per the government notice, only those people would get the overdraft facility whose transaction record has satisfactory operations in their account for some time. In March 2018, the Government of India stated that around 20% of Jan Dhan accounts were lying dormant.

In addition, while the Indian Government was ostensibly actively attempting to promote financial inclusion through this scheme, the Reserve Bank of India, permitted banks to charge customers for conducting ATM transactions beyond a certain number of times per month. This effectively prevented people from easily accessing their own savings and discouraged them from using formal banking channels.

See also
 Make in India
 Indian 500 and 1000 rupee currency demonetisation
 Pradhan Mantri Jeevan Jyoti Bima Yojana

References

External links

Banking in India
Projects established in 2014
Government schemes in India
Microfinance in India
Ministry of Finance (India)
Modi administration initiatives
2014 in Indian economy